Sportbladet is a Swedish newspaper about sport, mainly Swedish sport.

It is distributed together with Aftonbladet. The color of the newspaper is a variant of pink, often referred to as "baby pink". Braviken Paper Mill, Sweden is one of the producers of the paper used. Famous columnists include Simon Bank, Lars Anrell, Erik Niva and Lasse Sandlin.

References

External links
Official website 

2000 establishments in Sweden
Newspapers published in Stockholm
Sports mass media in Sweden
Newspapers established in 2000
Sports newspapers
Newspaper supplements
Swedish-language newspapers